The 2019 Hamburg European Open was a men's tennis tournament played on outdoor red clay courts. It was the 113th edition of the German Open Tennis Championships and part of the ATP Tour 500 series of the 2019 ATP Tour. It took place at the Am Rothenbaum in Hamburg, Germany, from 22 July until 28 July 2019. Fourth-seeded Nikoloz Basilashvili won the singles title.

Points and prize money

Points distribution

Prize money

Singles main draw entrants

Seeds

 1 Rankings are as of 15 July 2019.

Other entrants
The following players received wildcards into the main draw:
  Daniel Altmaier
  Yannick Hanfmann
  Rudolf Molleker
  Alexander Zverev

The following player received entry as a special exempt into the main draw:
  Salvatore Caruso

The following players received entry from the qualifying draw:
  Hugo Dellien
  Julian Lenz
  Thiago Monteiro
  Sumit Nagal

The following player received entry as a lucky loser:
  Alejandro Davidovich Fokina

Withdrawals
  Salvatore Caruso → replaced by  Alejandro Davidovich Fokina

Doubles main draw entrants

Seeds

1 Rankings are as of 15 July 2019.

Other entrants 
The following pairs received wildcards into the doubles main draw:
  Daniel Altmaier /  Johannes Härteis
  Rudolf Molleker /  Nenad Zimonjić

The following pair received entry from the qualifying draw:
  Julian Lenz /  Daniel Masur

Finals

Singles 

  Nikoloz Basilashvili defeated  Andrey Rublev, 7–5, 4–6, 6–3

Doubles 

  Oliver Marach /  Jürgen Melzer defeated  Robin Haase /  Wesley Koolhof, 6–2, 7–6 (7–3)

References

External links 
 

 
2010s in Hamburg
2019 in German tennis
2018
2019 ATP Tour
July 2019 sports events in Germany